Wild Things: Foursome is a 2010 erotic thriller film directed by Andy Hurst and starring Jillian Murray, Marnette Patterson, Ashley Parker Angel and John Schneider. It is a sequel to Wild Things: Diamonds in the Rough (2005) and the fourth and final film in the Wild Things series. The film was released on DVD on June 1, 2010.

Plot 
In the fictional Miami-Dade County city of Blue Bay, Carson Wheetly is the wealthy and spoiled teenaged son of NASCAR racer, Ted Wheetly. Carson hates his father, whom he blames for his mother, Sandra’s, death. He butts heads with Ted after throwing a raucous mansion party with his girlfriend, Rachel Thomas. Carson is introduced to pit-crew worker Brandi Cox through his friend, Shane Hendricks, and takes a liking to her, going as far as kissing her.

A few days later, Ted dies during a race after his car goes haywire and crashes. Detective Frank Walker is assigned to investigate and comes across several questionable circumstances. The car had contained an older engine part that was deemed faulty and recalled on the open market, and had also been stored at Shane’s garage the night before the race, despite Ted having hated him, as well as the security cameras missing two hours worth of footage from the same night.

Ted's timid and bumbling lawyer, George Stuben, announces during the reading of the will that Carson cannot inherit Ted's money and estate until he turns thirty or marries. Carson is initially reluctant to marry, but is shortly thereafter accused of rape by Brandi and jailed, with another partygoer named Linda Dobson claiming to be a witness. After this, Carson agrees to marry Rachel so that they can inherit the money for an out-of-court settlement. Brandi agrees to a settlement of $5 million, after which the charges are presumably dropped. She checks into a penthouse suite, where she engages in a foursome with Carson, Rachel, and Linda. They are revealed to be co-conspirators in a scheme to inherit Ted’s fortune and split the money amongst themselves. 

Meanwhile, Walker approaches Brandi, whom is perturbed by his inquiries of her ties to Ted’s death, which is now being investigated as a homicide. In a panicked state, she secretly meets with Rachel, whom then tells Carson of the encounter. Carson plots to have Brandi murdered to prevent her from potentially giving any details of the conspiracy to the police. 

Rachel arranges to meet with Brandi to lure her to a cheap motel, where Carson believes they will trap and kill her. Unbeknownst to him, Rachel and Brandi are actually plotting to kill Carson so that Rachel can inherit as a grieving widow and split the money between them. Rachel and Brandi then murder Carson by shooting him in the head and leave a forged suicide note. Rachel inherits the Wheetley fortune, but intends to murder Brandi to keep all the money for herself. Brandi, anticipating this, plots a scheme of her own to kill Rachel.

Brandi lures Rachel to an old swamp cabin. They both try to kill each other, and though Brandi gets the upper hand, they get discovered. They are both arrested and are separately interrogated by Walker, who reveals that he knows they were poor girls who grew up together and plotted to find rich men to marry. Brandi incriminates Rachel by revealing hidden video CDs that show both Carson and Rachel tampering with Ted’s car in order to cause his death, as well as Rachel's blood-stained blouse from murdering Carson at the motel. Rachel is convicted of murder and sent to prison while Brandi walks with no legal implications.

After closing the case, Walker retires and joins Brandi on a motor launch boat. He is revealed to be a bent cop who is getting a share of the Wheetley inheritance. However, while at sea, Brandi betrays Walker and stabs him to death and throws his body overboard. She then flees to Antigua to meet with George, who is revealed to have secured the Wheetley fortune by dissolving all of Ted’s enterprises and assets, and effectively being able to keep the money for himself. He has also presumably arranged for Rachel’s killing in prison, which is concluded as a suicide by the police and media. Under the pretense of intending to marry her, George immediately betrays Brandi by handing her a briefcase with counterfeit bills, which is revealed to be rigged with C4 that kills her after blowing up her speedboat. George joins Linda on the island, having secured over $154 million from the conspiracy.

Over the end credits, background details show George approaching Brandi at the swamp cabin. He had offered her a chance to exact revenge on Ted, who drove Brandi’s father to commit suicide after buying out commercial fishing areas in their neighborhood which left Brandi’s father jobless. Brandi then concocted the scheme with Rachel to infiltrate the Blue Bay wealthy elite in order to meet Carson and gain his trust. Rachel lied to Carson that Ted drove Sandra to suicide in order to manipulate him into murdering his father. Rachel also seduced Shane into giving her his keys to the garage after having sex with him at the mansion party. She also revealed to Carson that she and Brandi conspired to bring false rape charges to set up a viable out for the two of them to get married and immediately inherit the fortune. George presumably changed the will, unbeknownst to Ted and Carson, to manipulate it into fitting the plan of the conspiracy. He also placed the security footage from the garage and Rachel’s bloody shirt at the cabin as evidence for Walker to find. He had known that Walker had a history of being a corrupt cop and would be easily swayed into letting Brandi go in exchange for the money.

Cast
 Jillian Murray as Brandi Cox
 Marnette Patterson as Rachel Thomas
 Ashley Parker Angel as Carson Wheetly
 John Schneider as Detective Frank Walker
 Ethan Smith as George Stuben
 Jessie Nickson as Linda Dobson
 Cameron Daddo as Ted Wheetly
 Marc Macaulay as Captain Blanchard
 Josh Randall as Shane Hendricks

Reception
David Nusair of Reel Film Reviews gave it two out of four stars and called it "a surprisingly tedious endeavor that boasts so many similarities to its 1998 predecessor that it often feels like a remake". R.L. Shaffer of IGN gave it a 2 out 10 rating and wrote: "We've seen it all before, and under better circumstances" and recommended that viewers "watch a softcore skin flick on Cinemax and forget this film exists."

References

External links
 
 

2010s erotic thriller films
Direct-to-video erotic thriller films
2010 direct-to-video films
2010 films
American sexploitation films
Direct-to-video sequel films
Films set in Miami
Films shot in Florida
Films shot in Miami
Sony Pictures direct-to-video films
Stage 6 Films films
2010s English-language films
Films directed by Andy Hurst
2010s American films